Oscar Johnson (died March 2019) was an American tennis player who was the first black person to win a United States Lawn Tennis Association (USLTA) tournament – the Long Beach Junior Open on July 4, 1948, age 17.  He was awarded by the International Tennis Hall of Fame in 1987 and inducted to the Black Tennis Hall of Fame in 2010.

References

African-American male tennis players
American male tennis players
Year of birth missing
2019 deaths
Tennis players from Los Angeles
21st-century African-American people